The women's bantamweight competition of the boxing events at the 2022 Mediterranean Games in Oran, Algeria, was held from 26 June to 1 July at the EMEC Hall.

Like all Mediterranean Games boxing events, the competition was a straight single-elimination tournament. Both semifinal losers were awarded bronze medals, so no boxers competed again after their first loss.

Results

References

Women's bantamweight
2022 in women's boxing